Daniel Ash (born 31 July 1957) is an English musician, songwriter and singer. He became prominent in the late 1970s as the guitarist for the iconic goth rock band Bauhaus, which spawned two related bands led by Ash: Tones on Tail and Love and Rockets. Recently, he reunited with bandmate Kevin Haskins to form Poptone, a retrospective of their respective careers, featuring Kevin's daughter Diva Dompe on bass.  He has also recorded several solo albums. Several guitarists have listed Ash as an influence, including Dave Navarro of Jane's Addiction, Kim Thayil of Soundgarden, Hide of X Japan and John Frusciante of the Red Hot Chili Peppers.

Life and work
After going to concerts in his teenage years, Ash decided to perform on a stage in some way. He started playing guitar around the age of 15, but confessed to having been very lazy and learning only three chords, and nothing more, for about three years. He began playing in cover bands, often together with future band mates David J and Kevin Haskins, whom he had known since nursery school. His first gig was in the Glasgow Rangers Workman's Club.

Ash had become friends with Peter Murphy during his teenage years. Ash went to art school and Murphy went to work in a printing factory. They met up again five years later and Ash suggested forming a band. Rigging up a makeshift rehearsal space, Ash played an Echo 12 – bar blues, while Murphy sang a series of newspaper articles. Four weeks later, they formed Bauhaus and recorded "Bela Lugosi's Dead".

That song, released in 1979, became one of the most influential songs in gothic rock music, even though they saw themselves as a "dark glam" band and have always distanced themselves from the gothic label. From early on, he was intent on sounding original, and often tried to "make the guitar not sound like a guitar". He worked to develop a guitar style that included other-worldly and atmospheric sounds by the use of an EBow. He typically has used a Telecaster guitar, HH amplifiers and Marshall 4x12 cabinets for his stage gear. Later in his career, he relied heavily on the Fernandes Sustainer system to achieve sounds similar to the EBow.

After nearly five years of recording and performing, Bauhaus broke up and Ash put together Tones on Tail with Bauhaus drummer Kevin Haskins. As Ash described them: "We were a motley crew of individuals who essentially wanted to sound like a band from Venus or Mars!"  In 1984, Tones on Tail was disbanded; Ash founded Love and Rockets in 1985 with Haskins and David J, also of Bauhaus. In an interview in June 2009, Ash emphatically stated that he had no further plans to play with Love and Rockets.

Ash has stated that guitar solos do not interest him much, since they rely on a musician's ego. He cares much more for the craft of songwriting and the overall production of a song rather than a focus on guitar or any other single instrument. During the last ten years, he has been experimenting more with electronic music, both with Love and Rockets and solo, limiting the use of guitar as an extra element to the songs. Since the last reformation of Bauhaus, however, he has been returning to a more guitar-based rock sound.

In 2008, Bauhaus released Go Away White, (their first studio album in 25 years) which was followed by a world tour.

Love and Rockets last played at Coachella Music and Arts Festival in 2008.

In June 2009, Ash released a cover of the David Essex song "Rock On", featuring singer Zak Ambrose on vocals. Recorded at the Swing House rehearsal and recording complex in Hollywood, the track is on the Swing House Sessions Vol 1 EP.  Later in 2009, Ash released a four-song EP exclusively through iTunes, entitled "It's A Burn Out".

In March 2017, Daniel Ash, Kevin Haskins and Haskin's daughter Diva Dompé announced Poptone and a US tour, featuring songs by Tones on Tail, Love and Rockets and Bauhaus.

In 2020, during the Covid pandemic, Ash created a new band, Ashes and Diamonds, comprising Paul Denman on bass, formerly of Sade, and Bruce Smith the former drummer with The Pop Group, Rip Rig + Panic and Public Image Ltd. An album was recorded and is 

Ash joined Jane's Addiction on stage at Madison Square Garden in 2022 to perform Jane's Addiction's "Jane Says" and "Slice of Life" by Bauhaus.

Discography as band member
Bauhaus discography
Tones on Tail discography
Love and Rockets discography
The Bubblemen Discography

Solo discography

Studio albums

Singles, EPs and promos

Compilations

Other 
1991 – "Heaven Is Waiting", a B-side from the "This Love" and "Walk This Way" singles, was included on the Beggars Banquet Records compilation album Money Is Not the Answer
2000 – "Trouble" from Daniel Ash appeared in the 2000 film American Psycho
2001 – Ash provided vocals and guitar on the title track from DJ Keoki's album Jealousy
2003 – Ash recorded a version of "Fever" for the FX (TV network) program Nip/Tuck, which was included on the Nip/Tuck: Original TV Soundtrack
2004 – "Come Alive" from Daniel Ash appeared in the role-playing video game Vampire: The Masquerade – Bloodlines
2008 – Ash provided guitar on several tracks from the rock opera film Repo! The Genetic Opera.
2017 – Ash remixed the track "maniera" for sukekiyo's Adoratio album, released in June.

References

External links

 
 
 
 
 Goth Is Dead says Daniel Ash from Ventura County Reporter

Living people
English rock guitarists
Gothic rock musicians
British post-punk musicians
Bauhaus (band) members
Love and Rockets (band) members
Tones on Tail members
1957 births